Jiří Polívka (6 March 1858 in Enns – 21 March 1933 in Prague) was a Czech linguist, slavist, literary historian and folklorist. He was a disciple of Jan Gebauer. In 1895 he was appointed professor at Charles University in Prague. He became a corresponding member of the Czech Academy of Sciences and Arts and corresponding member of the St. Petersburg Academy of Sciences (1901). He was a supporter of Theodor Benfey’s migration theory. His major work was the collection Slavic Tales (1932) and studies about Slavic dialectology.

Polívka is interred at the Vinohrady Cemetery in Prague.

References

Literature 
 HLÔŠKOVÁ, Hana  – ZELENKOVÁ, Anna (Eds.): Slavista Jiří Polívka v kontexte literatúry a folklóru I.–II. Bratislava: Katedra etnológie a kultúrnej antropológie FF UK, Slavistický ústav Jána Stanislava SAV, Ústav etnológie SAV; Brno: Česká asociace slavistů, Slavistická společnost Franka Wollmana v Brne, 2008. 248 p. .

1858 births
1933 deaths
Linguists from the Czech Republic
Czech literary historians
Slavists
People from Linz-Land District
Charles University alumni
University of Vienna alumni